WWCD may refer to:

 WWCD (AM), a radio station (1580 AM) in Columbus, Ohio
 WWLG, a radio station (102.5 FM) in Baltimore, Ohio, which held the call sign WWCD from 2010 to 2020
 WOSA, a radio station (101.1 FM) in Grove City, Ohio, which held the call sign WWCD from 1990 to 2010
WWCD (album), 2019 album by Griselda